Confiserie Roodthooft is a family company producing Belgian sweets and toffees. The company was founded by Louis Roodthooft and Johanna Stoops in Antwerp, Belgium in 1925. Roodthooft was in charge of sales whilst Stoops took care of the everyday running of the factory, which was not a usual thing for a Belgian woman to do back then. 

The company's most famous product is the 'Caramella Mokatine', also known as the 'Arabier', a coffee-flavoured sweet in a sachetti wrapper. The sachetti wrapper was introduced to Belgium by Louis Roodthooft in 1934. The third-generation family company currently exports to countries all over the world. Their latest range, "Our Original Belgian Toffees" combines original recipes from the 1920s with contemporary packaging.

The company's headquarters are in a listed building built in 1905-7 by former students of Victor Horta.

References

External links
Official Website
Report in Chocolate Export magazine (in English)
Report in Chocolate Export magazine (in French)
Report on the company in Dutch on Belgian national radio
Audio file 

Companies based in Antwerp
Food and drink companies established in 1925
Food and drink companies of Belgium
Belgian companies established in 1925